Newland railway station, also known as Cherry Orchard railway station, served the village of Newland, Gloucestershire, England, from 1883 to 1917 on the Coleford Railway.

History 
The station was opened on 1 September 1883 by the Great Western Railway. It closed along with the line on 1 January 1917.

References 

Disused railway stations in Gloucestershire
Former Great Western Railway stations
Railway stations in Great Britain opened in 1883
Railway stations in Great Britain closed in 1917
1883 establishments in England
1917 disestablishments in England